The elegant coral snake (Micrurus elegans) is a species of elapid snake, native to southern Mexico and Guatemala. There are two recognized subspecies.

Geographic range

Habitat
The preferred natural habitat of M. elegans is forest, but it has also been found in agricultural areas.

Reproduction
M. elegans is oviparous.

Subspecies
There are two subspecies that are recognized as being valid, including the nominotypical subspecies.
Micrurus elegans elegans (Jan, 1858) 
Micrurus elegans veraepacis Schmidt, 1933

Nota bene: A trinomial authority in parentheses indicates that the subspecies was originally described in a genus other than Micrurus.

References

Further reading
Heimes P (2016). Snakes of Mexico: Herpetofauna Mexicana Vol. I. Frankfurt, Germany: Chimaira. 572 pp. .
Jan [G] (1858). "Plan d'une Iconographie descriptive des Ophidiens et description sommaire de nouvelles espèces de Serpents ". Revue et Magasin de Zoologie Pure et Apliquée, Paris, 2e Série [Second Series] 10: 438–449, 514–527. (Elaps elegans, new species, p. 517). (in French).
Liner EA (2007). "A Checklist of the Amphibians and Reptiles of México". Occasional Papers of the Museum of Natural Science, Louisiana State University (80): 1–60. (Micrurus elegans, p. 53).
Schmidt KP (1933). "Preliminary Account of the Coral Snakes of Central America and Mexico". Field Museum of Natural History Zoological Series 20: 29–40. (Micrurus elegans veraepacis, new subspecies, p. 32).
Soto-Huerta, Karlo A.; Clause, Adam G. (2017). "Distribution and Range Extension of the Elegant Coralsnake , Micrurus elegans ". The Southwestern Naturalist'' 62 (4): 303–308.

Micrurus
Reptiles described in 1858
Reptiles of Mexico
Reptiles of Guatemala